The Williams' bon chrétien pear, commonly called the Williams pear, or the Bartlett pear in the United States and Canada, is the most commonly grown variety of pear in most countries outside Asia.

It is a cultivar (cultivated variety) of the species Pyrus communis, commonly known as the European Pear. The fruit has a bell shape, considered the traditional pear shape in the west, and its green skin turns yellow upon later ripening, although red-skinned derivative varieties exist. It is considered a summer pear, not as tolerant of cold as some varieties. It is often eaten raw, but holds its shape well when baked, and is a common choice for canned or other processed pear uses.

History

The origins of this variety are uncertain. "Bon Chrétien" (Good Christian) is named after Francis of Paola, a holy man whom King Louis XI of France had called to his deathbed as a healer in 1483. Francis offered the king a pear seed from his native Calabria with instructions to plant and care. Hence the pear tree was called "Good Christian". The Williams pear is thought to date from 1765 to 1770 from the yard of an Aldermaston, England, schoolmaster named John Stair, giving rise to the now-obscure synonyms 'Aldermaston' pear and 'Stairs' pear. A nurseryman named Williams later acquired the variety, and after introducing it to the rest of England, the pear became known as the Williams Pear. However, the pear's full name is Williams' Bon Chretien, or "Williams' good Christian."

In 1799 James Carter imported several Williams trees into the United States, and they were planted on the grounds of Thomas Brewer in Roxbury, Massachusetts. The Massachusetts estate was later acquired by Enoch Bartlett of Dorchester, Massachusetts. Unaware of their origin, Bartlett named the pears after himself and introduced the variety into the United States. It was not realised that Bartlett and Williams Pears were the same until 1828, when new trees arrived from Europe. By that time the Bartlett variety had become vastly popular in the United States, and they are still generally known as Bartlett pears in the US and Canada, although there are about 150 other synonyms worldwide.

Physical description

The pear exhibits a pyriform  "pear shape," with a rounded bell on the bottom half of the fruit, and then a definite shoulder with a smaller neck or stem end. Williams are aromatic pears, and have what many consider the definitive "pear flavour". Colours of the pear vary from green (when unripe), to yellow (ripe) and red. Red Bartletts or Williams are very similar to the traditional Williams, aside from ripening to a reddish colour rather than a yellow colour. Red-skinned mutant clones (i.e. "sports") of the Williams are increasing in popularity, including three major varieties in the US: the Max Red Bartlett, the Sensation Red Bartlett, and the Rosired Bartlett. One study of several macrosatellite loci in 63 European Pear (Pyrus communis L.) cultivars did not distinguish Max Red Bartlett and Sensation Red Bartlett from the standard Williams, which was expected since the red mutants were derived from the Williams by mutation. Dozens of other cultivars and hybrids have been created from Williams, created for properties like cold resistance, ripening time, skin colouration, and grafting compatibility.

Optimum conditions for ripening are in dry shady areas, and ripening usually takes 7 to 10 days from when the pear was picked. As the pear ripens the color will slowly change to a soft yellow and the pear will soften. Commercially produced pears are normally picked and shipped to the stores while green.

Tree
Pear trees are usually productive for 50 to 75 years though some still produce fruit after 100 years.

Height:  with slightly less spread
Flowers: White flowers grouped in a corymb
Blooming time: April–May (in the Northern Hemisphere)
Fruit and seeds: Large, golden yellow skin, brownish red blush, classic shape with smooth, white flesh. Harvest from mid-August to mid-September (Northern Hemisphere).
Leaves: The leaves are simple, glossy green leaves that alternate on the twig. They have fine teeth on the margin.
Elevation: 
Habitat: Orchards and landscaping

Production and uses

US pear production

In 1985, this variety represented 80% of US pear production while in 2004 it represented 50% of reported pear production, displaced primarily by the continuing growth of d'Anjou and Bosc pears, both winter pears more tolerant of cold than the Bartlett.

While more pears are sold fresh in the US than processed, Bartlett pears are the primary choice for canned halves, puree, and most pear juice and nectar in the US, comprising about two-thirds of Bartlett production. Bartletts are traditionally known as the canning pear due to their "definitive flavor and sweetness," making them well-suited for many forms of processing.

Named mutants
Several "sports" or mutants of the Williams pear have received United States plant patents:

Offspring
For several decades, the Williams pear has been used actively as a parent in the production of new varieties:

Distilled spirits

The Williams pear is used in making both Poire Williams, a fruit brandy, and Belle de Brillet, an infused cognac.

The pear is also very popular in western Balkans where it is distilled into brandy known as Viljamovka, similar to Poire Williams but often with higher alcohol percentage. 
Some producers of Viljamovka include an entire pear inside each bottle. This is achieved by attaching the bottle to a budding pear tree so that the pear will grow inside it.

Notes

External links
Video footage of a Williams Pear in a bottle

Pear cultivars
Aldermaston